"Cartesian theater" is a derisive term coined by philosopher and cognitive scientist Daniel Dennett to refer pointedly to a defining aspect of what he calls Cartesian materialism, which he considers to be the often unacknowledged remnants of Cartesian dualism in modern materialist theories of the mind.

Overview
Descartes originally claimed that consciousness requires an immaterial soul, which interacts with the body via the pineal gland of the brain. Dennett says that, when the dualism is removed, what remains of Descartes' original model amounts to imagining a tiny theater in the brain where a homunculus (small person), now physical, performs the task of observing all the sensory data projected on a screen at a particular instant, making the decisions and sending out commands (cf. the homunculus argument).

The term "Cartesian theater" was brought up in the context of the multiple drafts model that Dennett posits in Consciousness Explained (1991):

See also 
 Circular reasoning
 Homunculus argument
 Inside Out
 Münchhausen trilemma
 The Numskulls
 Turtles all the way down

Notes

References

 Dennett, D. and Kinsbourne, M. (1992) "Time and the Observer: the Where and When of Consciousness in the Brain". (1992) Behavioral and Brain Sciences, 15, 183-247, 1992. Reprinted in The Philosopher's Annual, Grim, Mar and Williams, eds., vol. XV-1992, 1994, pp. 23–68; Noel Sheehy and Tony Chapman, eds., Cognitive Science, Vol. I, Elgar, 1995, pp. 210–274.

External links

 Richard Chappell on "The Cartesian Theater"
 Qualia! Now showing at a Theater near you by Eric Lormand



Arguments in philosophy of mind
Consciousness studies
Mental content